Riksteatret (English: National Traveling Theater) is a Norwegian touring theatre. It was established by law in 1948. Its first performance was in Kirkenes in 1949, with Sigurd Christiansen's play En reise i natten. The theatre plays on about 200 different stages throughout the country. Its first theatre director was Fritz von der Lippe, who held this position from 1949 to 1968. Ellen Horn has been theatre director from 2005.

References

Theatres in Norway
1948 establishments in Norway
Touring theatre
Performing groups established in 1948